The Checkers Federation of Armenia, also known as the Armenian Draughts Federation, is the regulating body of checkers (also known as draughts) in Armenia, governed by the Armenian Olympic Committee. The headquarters of the federation is located in Yerevan.

History
The Checkers Federation of Armenia is currently led by president Albert Poghosyan. The Federation oversees the training of checkers specialists and organizes Armenia's participation in European and international draughts/checkers competitions. In November 2019, the Federation hosted the Checkers World Cup in Armenia. The Federation also organizes national tournaments and youth training/championships. The Federation is a full member of the World Draughts Federation, within the "European Division".

See also 
 Armenian draughts
 Chess Federation of Armenia
 Chess in Armenia
 Sport in Armenia

References

External links 
Checkers Federation of Armenia on Facebook

Sports governing bodies in Armenia
Draughts organizations